The second USS Decatur was a  in the United States Navy. She was named in honor of Stephen Decatur.

Construction
Decatur was launched on 26 September 1900 by William R. Trigg Company, Richmond, Virginia; sponsored by Miss M. D. Mayo, great-grandniece of Commodore Decatur; and commissioned on 19 May 1902, Lieutenant Lloyd Horwitz Chandler in command.

Pre-World War I

Decatur was designated lead vessel of the 1st Torpedo Flotilla with which she conducted drills and maneuvers along the Eastern Seaboard and in the Caribbean until December 1903, when the flotilla departed Norfolk for the Asiatic Station, sailing by way of the Suez Canal.

Arriving at Cavite, Philippines, on 14 April 1904, Decatur exercised along the China coast and cruised in Philippine waters until placed in reserve at Cavite on 5 December 1905. For the next three years, she made infrequent cruises, including one to the southern Philippines in January–February 1908 and Saigon in May 1908.

Decatur ran aground on a sand bar in the Philippines on 7 July 1908 while under the command of Ensign Chester W. Nimitz. The ship was pulled free the next day, and Nimitz was court-martialed, found guilty of neglect of duty, and issued a letter of reprimand.

Placed out of commission on 18 February 1909, Decatur was placed in commission in reserve on 22 April 1910 and in full commission on 22 December. She resumed operations with the Torpedo Flotilla, cruising in the southern Philippines and between ports of China and Japan until on 1 August 1917, when she departed for the Mediterranean.

World War I

Assigned to US Patrol Squadrons, Decatur arrived at Gibraltar on 20 October for patrol and convoy duty in both the Atlantic and Mediterranean until on 8 December 1918. Decatur arrived at Philadelphia on 6 February 1919 and was decommissioned there on 20 June. She was sold to Henry A. Hitner's Sons Company on 3 January 1920.

Noteworthy commanding officers
 Lieutenant Lloyd Horwitz Chandler (19 May 1902 – 22 April 1904) (Later Rear Admiral)
 Lieutenant Dudley Wright Knox (22 April 1904 – 24 March 1906) (Later Commodore)
 Ensign Chester William Nimitz (1 July 1908 – 29 July 1908) (Later Fleet admiral and Chief of Naval Operations) – Nimitz-class aircraft carrier named for him
 Lieutenant commander Harry Adrian McClure (31 January 1918 – 4 August 1918) (Later Commodore)
 Lieutenant Ralph R. Stewart – Received the Navy Cross for his leadership during Decaturs transit from the Philippines to Gibraltar during WWI.

Notes

References

Jackson, Robert "Fighting Ships of The World." London: Amber Books Ltd, 2004 Pg.153 
 O'Neal, Kirkman (1974) O'Neal Steel: Memoirs of Kirkman O'Neal. Birmingham: private printing – includes a wartime diary kept by Lieutenant Kirkman O'Neal serving aboard the Decatur from January to December 1918.

 

Bainbridge-class destroyers
Philippine–American War ships of the United States
World War I destroyers of the United States
Ships built in Richmond, Virginia
1900 ships